The 4.8-inch HE Multi Barrel Rocket Launched  YARMUK, or simply Yarmuk, is a  unguided Surface-to-surface rocket developed by the Pakistan Ordnance Factories.

The rocket is named after the famous Battle of Yarmuk between the Rashidun Caliphate and Byzantine Empire which resulted in the end of Byzantine rule in Syria.

Design & Performance 
The 122mm calibre Yarmuk rockets are designed to be fired from MLRS rocket artillery systems. The rockets are fitted with Composition B explosive warheads which deal explosive and fragmentation damage that are effective against Infantry and lightly armoured targets. Moreover, the rockets have a max Time of flight of 78 seconds with 400m/s muzzle velocity enabling them to reach a max range of 20km.

Alleged sales to Ukraine 
In February 2023, Indian media claimed Pakistan had sent close to 10,000 122mm Grad missiles to Ukraine via Germany and Poland. Although the type of missiles weren't specified, it's likely the missiles are the 122mm Yarmooks.

Operators 

Alleged

See Also 
BM-21
Rocket (weapon)
MLRS
Zuni rocket
Mighty Mouse rocket
HVAR

References

External Links 

Rocket artillery
Weapons of Pakistan